Fuad Aslanov (born January 2, 1983 in Sumgait) is an Azerbaijani boxer who competed in the flyweight division (– 51 kg) at the 2004 Summer Olympics and won the bronze medal. He qualified for the 2004 Summer Olympics in Athens, by ending up in second place at the 3rd AIBA European 2004 Olympic Qualifying Tournament in Gothenburg.

Olympic results 
Defeated George Jouvin Rakotoarimbelo (Madagascar) (walk-over)
Defeated Nikoloz Izoria (Georgia) 27-21
Defeated Andrzej Rżany (Poland) 24-23
Lost to Jérôme Thomas (France) 18-23

References

1983 births
Living people
Azerbaijani male boxers
Olympic boxers of Azerbaijan
Boxers at the 2004 Summer Olympics
Olympic bronze medalists for Azerbaijan
Olympic medalists in boxing
Medalists at the 2004 Summer Olympics
Flyweight boxers
People from Sumgait